Gaither may refer to:

Places 
In the United States
 Gaither, Maryland, an unincorporated community
 Gaither, Missouri, a ghost town
 Gaither Township, Boone County, Arkansas, a civil township

People

As a surname 
 Bailey Gaither (born 1997), American football player
 Benjamin Gaither (1838), founder of the U.S. city of Gaithersburg, MD
 Bill Gaither, various people
 Bill Gaither Trio (AKA The Gaither Trio), an American gospel music group founded by Bill Gaither (gospel singer) (born 1936)
 Gaither Homecoming, a series of videos, music recordings and concerts; organized, promoted and usually presented by the gospel singer Bill Gaither
 Gaither Vocal Band, an American gospel music group founded by the gospel singer Bill Gaither
 Gaither Vocal Band discography
 Burgess Sidney Gaither (180792), North Carolina politician and attorney who served in the Confederate States Congress during the American Civil War
 Daniele Gaither (born 1970), American comic actress
 Danny Gaither (19382001), American gospel music singer, onetime member of the Bill Gaither Trio
 David Gaither (born 1957), American businessman and politician in Minnesota
 Edmund Barry Gaither (born 1944), American museum curator
 Frances Gaither (18891955), American novelist
 Gloria Gaither (born 1942), American Christian songwriter, author, speaker, editor and academic, wife of the gospel singer Bill Gaither
 Horace Rowan Gaither (AKA H. Rowan Gaithier, 190961), American attorney, investment banker, and administrator at the Ford Foundation
 Gaither Report, the report of the Security Resources Panel of the President's Science Advisory Committee, presented to President Eisenhower on November 7, 1957; entitled Deterrence & Survival in the Nuclear Age, but often referred to by the name of the Panel's chairman, H. Rowan Gauthier
 Henry Chew Gaither (17781845), U.S. politician in Maryland, father of William Lingan Gaither
 Israel Gaither (born ), American official in the Salvation Army
 Jake Gaither (190394), American college football coach
 Jake Gaither Gymnasium, a multi-purpose arena in Tallahassee, FL, built in 1963 and named for Jake Gaither
 Jared Gaither (born 1986), American football player
 Katryna Gaither (born 1975), American female basketball player
 Marcus Gaither (1961–2020), American-French basketball player
 Nathan Gaither (17881862), U.S. Representative from Kentucky
 Omar Gaither (born 1984), American football player
 Ridgely Gaither (190392), American army general
 Scott Gaither (born 1969), American soccer player
 William Lingan Gaither (181358), U.S. politician in Maryland, son of Henry Chew Gaither
 William S. Gaither (19322009), American civil engineer and president of Drexel University

As a forename 
 Alfred G. Allen (AKA Alfred Gaither Allen, 18671932), U.S. Representative from Ohio
 Gaither Carlton (190172), American old-time fiddle player and banjo player
 Joseph Gaither Pratt (191079), American psychologist who specialized in the field of parapsychology

Other 
 Gaither High School, a public high school located in the Northdale area of Hillsborough County, FL; named after its onetime principal Vivian Gaither
 Gaither House (disambiguation), various U.S. historic buildings

See also 
 Gaithersburg, Maryland, a U.S. city founded by Benjamin Gaither
 Lita Gaithers (born before 1999), American singer-songwriter, actress, and playwright
 Gaultier (disambiguation)
 Gauthier (disambiguation)
 Gautier (disambiguation)